František Barát (born 25 July 1950) is a Czech former football player who has also worked as a football manager.

Barát managed Příbram until being replaced by Italian Massimo Morales in April 2008 after 17 rounds of the 2007–08 Czech 2. Liga. He became manager of SK Strakonice 1908 in September 2010 but left in June 2011, when he was announced as the new manager of Bohemians Prague, replacing Jaromír Jindráček.

References

External links
 Profile at idnes.cz 

1950 births
Living people
Czech footballers
Czechoslovak footballers
Czech football managers
1. FK Příbram managers
FK Bohemians Prague (Střížkov) managers
Bohemians 1905 managers
Association football midfielders
Sportspeople from Topoľčany